Laking or hemolysis is the rupturing of red blood cells.

Laking may also refer to:
Laking baronets

People with the surname
Charles Laking
Francis Laking
George Laking
Guy Francis Laking
Janice Laking

See also
 Lake (disambiguation)